The 2022 European Men's U-18 Handball Championship was the sixteenth edition of the European Men's U-18 Handball Championship, held in Podgorica, Montenegro from 4 to 14 August 2022.

Qualification

Draw
The draw was held on 24 February 2022 in Vienna.

Preliminary round
All times are local (UTC+2).

Group A

Group B

Group C

Group D

Intermediate round
Points and goals gained in the preliminary group against teams that proceeded to the Intermediate round was transferred.

Group I1

Group I2

Main round
Points and goals gained in the preliminary group against teams that advanced was transferred to the main round.

Group M1

Group M2

Final round

Bracket

Championship bracket

9th place bracket

5th place bracket

13th place bracket

13–16th place semifinals

9–12th place semifinals

5–8th place semifinals

Semifinals

15th place game

13th place game

Eleventh place game

Ninth place game

Seventh place game

Fifth place game

Third place game

Final

Final ranking

Awards

All-Star Team

References

External links 
 Official website

European Men's U-18 Handball Championship
European U-18 Handball Championship
European U-18 Handball Championship
European U-18 Handball Championship
Sports competitions in Podgorica